Carinotetraodon salivator, also known as the striped red-eye puffer, is a species of freshwater pufferfish in the family Tetraodontidae. It is a tropical species known only from Sarawak, Malaysian Borneo, where it occurs at a depth range of 1 to 2 m (3 to 7 ft). It is found in large, fast-flowing streams with silty and sandy bottoms, leaf litter, and submerged logs. It reaches  standard length and is occasionally seen in the aquarium trade.

References 

salivator
Freshwater fish of Borneo
Freshwater fish of Malaysia
Endemic fauna of Borneo
Endemic fauna of Malaysia
Fish described in 1995
Taxa named by Maurice Kottelat